Joseph John Ausanio (born December 9, 1965) is a former Major League Baseball relief pitcher who appeared in 41 games for the New York Yankees in  and . He is the current Director of Baseball Operations for the New York Yankees High A affiliate Hudson Valley Renegades in the New York Penn League.  He is also the current Head Softball Coach at Marist College.

Early life
Ausanio was born in Kingston, New York and attended Catholic High School in Kingston. He played college baseball at Jacksonville University in Jacksonville, Florida.

Professional career
Ausanio was drafted by the Pittsburgh Pirates in the 11th round (278th overall) in the 1988 Major League Baseball Draft. In November 1992, he was selected off waivers by the Montreal Expos and in December 1993, he was drafted by the New York Yankees in the 1993 minor league draft. Ausanio played his first Major League game on July 14, 1994, for the Yankees and played for them until 1995. He was signed as a free agent by the New York Mets in November 1995 and finished his career with three appearances with the Colorado Rockies' Triple-A affiliate, the Colorado Springs Sky Sox in 1997.

After retiring as a player, Ausanio was a color commentator for the Hudson Valley Renegades (High-A affiliate of the New York Yankees) in 1998. He is currently the director of baseball operations for the Renegades and the head coach of the Marist Red Foxes softball team. Joe has also made several appearances in a professional wrestling ring, competing in four matches with the New York independent promotion Northeast Wrestling from 2012 to 2015. On September 22, 2012, in the main event of NEW's Wrestling Under The Stars in Fishkill, NY, Ausanio teamed with Goldust to defeat Romeo Roselli and Luke Robinson.

Family life
Ausanio currently lives in New Windsor, New York with his family. He has two sons, Joey and Kevin.

Notes

References
 Terry Egan, Good Guys of Baseball (2000). Simon and Schuster.

External links

The New York Times: BASEBALL: The Oldest Rookie; Joe Ausanio Savored His One-Month Walk in the Sun
Joe Ausanio Biography

Living people
1965 births
Major League Baseball pitchers
Baseball players from New York (state)
Sportspeople from Kingston, New York
Jacksonville Dolphins baseball players
New York Yankees players
Columbus Clippers players
American softball coaches
Marist Red Foxes softball coaches
People from Marlboro, New York
Jacksonville University alumni